Saint Sabbas Stratelates (Sava Stratelat, Sabas Stratilat, Savva Stratilatus), Sabbas the General of Rome (died 272, Tiber River, Rome) was an early Christian warrior saint and martyr, was Roman military general under emperor Aurelian. He is the 'twin' of Saint Sabbas the Goth. His martyrdom was followed by 70 Roman soldiers.

Saint Sabbas Stratelates came from a Gothic tribe. For his bravery he attained the high rank of military commander or stratelates, and he served under the Roman emperor Aurelian (270-275). From his youth, Sabbas was a Christian and he fervently followed the commands of Christ. He helped the needy, and visited Christians in prison. Saint Sabbas had the gift of wonderworking, healing the sick and casting out demons in the name of Christ.

Martyrdom
When the emperor learned that Saint Sabbas was a Christian, he demanded that he apostatize. The martyr threw down his military belt and declared that he would not forsake his faith. They beat him, burned him with torches, and threw him into a cauldron with tar, but the martyr remained unharmed.

Looking on at his torments, seventy soldiers came to believe in Christ. They were beheaded by the sword. St Sabbas was thrown in prison. At midnight, while he was praying, Christ appeared to the martyr and shone on him the light of His Glory. The Savior bade him not to fear, but to stand firm. Encouraged, the Martyr Sabbas underwent new torture in the morning, and was drowned in a river in 272.

Memory
 May 7 - in Russian, Ukrainian and Serbian Orthodox Churches that use old calendar
 April 24 - in new calendar churches

External links
 Serbian Orthodox Church: The Holy Martyr Sabbas Stratelates (April 24)
 OCA: Lives of all saints commemorated on April 24: Martyr Sava Stratelates "the General" of Rome
  Protection of the Mother of God Church in Rochester: The Holy Martyr Sabbas Stratelates
 Catholic saints: St. Sabas
 (in Russian) Martyr Sabbas Stratelates

2nd-century births
272 deaths
Ancient Roman generals
Italian saints
3rd-century Christian martyrs
3rd-century Romans